Richard Fielding Harless (August 6, 1905 – November 24, 1970) was a U.S. Representative from Arizona.

Life and career 
Born in Kelsey, Texas, Harless moved to Thatcher, Arizona, in 1917 and attended the grade and high schools. He graduated from University of Arizona in 1928. He taught school at Marana, Arizona from 1928 to 1930. He graduated from the law school of the University of Arizona in 1933. He was admitted to the bar the same year and commenced practice in Phoenix, Arizona.

In Phoenix, Harless served as Assistant City Attorney and in 1936 was elected Assistant Attorney General of Arizona. From 1938 to 1942, Harless served as Maricopa County Attorney. He was married to Meredith Howard Harless, a writer and radio personality. They wed on November 28, 1948, in Alexandria, Virginia.

Harless was elected as a Democrat to the Seventy-eighth, Seventy-ninth, and Eightieth Congresses (January 3, 1943 – January 3, 1949).  He was one of the main sponsors of the Indian Voting Rights Act of 1947.

Harless did not seek renomination in the 1948 House election, and was unsuccessful in an attempt to gain the gubernatorial nomination.
He was an unsuccessful candidate for the Democratic nomination in 1954 for the Eighty-fourth Congress.
He was Democratic nominee in 1960 for the Eighty-seventh Congress but was not elected.
He resumed the practice of law.

He died in Phoenix on November 24, 1970, and was interred in Greenwood Memorial Park in that city.

References

1905 births
1970 deaths
People from Upshur County, Texas
University of Arizona alumni
Democratic Party members of the United States House of Representatives from Arizona
People from Thatcher, Arizona
Politicians from Phoenix, Arizona
20th-century American politicians